Mohammed Ali Naqvi (born 1979) is a Pakistani filmmaker based in New York City. He is known for documentaries which shed light on the socio political conditions of Pakistan, and feature strong characters on personal journeys of self-discovery. Notable films include Insha’Allah Democracy (2017), Among the Believers (2015), Shame (2007), and Terror’s Children (2003).

Early life and background
Naqvi was born in Montreal, Canada, and spent his early years between Canada, Pakistan and the US. After completing a Bachelor of Arts degree from the University of Pennsylvania in 2001, and theatre training from the Lee Strasberg Theatre and Film Institute, Naqvi founded B.L.A.H Productions, an off-off-Broadway theatre company in New York, for which he produced, directed and acted in a number of plays.

Career
In 2003, Naqvi produced Terror’s Children (Discovery Channel) in collaboration with Pakistani Emmy-Award winner Sharmeen Obaid-Chinoy. The film portrays young Afghan refugees living in Pakistan post 9/11 in refugee camps and extreme poverty mediated only by the madrassa school network which provides basic necessities in return for hardline militant religious schooling. The film won the Overseas Press Club Award: The Carl Spielvogel Award in 2004 and the South Asian Journalist Award in 2004.

In 2005, Naqvi produced Big River which was directed by Atsushi Funahashi. The film depicted a story about cross-cultural friendship between a Pakistani man, a Japanese boy, and an American woman who meet while traveling in Arizona. The film featured as an official selection at the Berlin International Film Festival (2005), the Karlovy Vary International Film Festival (2006), and the Pusan International Film Festival (2005), where it was also nominated for the New Currents Award.

In 2006, Naqvi wrote, produced and directed Shame (Paramount/Showtime), a hard-hitting documentary chronicling the life of Mukhtaran Mai, the Pakistani survivor of gang rape who went on to become a human rights activist after taking her perpetrators to trial in a landmark case. The film won several awards including a Special Emmy Award (2008), the Amnesty International Durban Human Rights Award (2007), and the Women in Leadership Award at the Full Frame Documentary Film Festival (2007).

In 2012, Naqvi directed Shabeena’s Quest (Al-Jazeera) with Hemal Trivedi. The film features the story of Shabeena, a remarkable school principal fighting for the right of girls to be educated despite age-old traditions leading to early marriages.

In 2014, Naqvi directed Pakistan’s Hidden Shame (Channel 4 UK), which was produced by Jamie Doran. This documentary highlights pedophilia in Pakistan by depicting vulnerable young boys on the streets of Peshawar who have suffered sexual abuse at the hands of truck drivers passing through the city. In the sexually frustrated and impoverished society lacking healthy outlets for sexual needs, boys as young as seven are prostituted for petty cash in makeshift hostels. The film was screened at the Sheffield Doc/Fest (2014), and won Best Documentary at the United Nations Association Film Festival (2014).

In 2015, Naqvi directed Among the Believers with Hemal Trivedi. It was produced by Jonathan Goodman Levitt and Hemal Trivedi, and the executive producer was Whitney Dow. The documentary examines the role of the Red Mosque (Lal Masjid) and its network of religious schools (madrasas) in manufacturing militant religious sectarianism in Pakistan. The film highlights Maulana Abdul Aziz Ghazi’s role as the leader of the Red Mosque, pushing for a hardline interpretation of Islam and Jihad. As a counterpoint, the film also features the nuclear physicist and civil activist Pervez Hoodbhoy who champions a secular education system in favor of tolerant and progressive values. These differing ideologies play out in the state sanctioned vacuum of educational and financial infrastructure in poverty stricken villages of Pakistan, which the Red Mosque is quick to fill in exchange for young recruits.

The film has its US premiere at Tribeca Film Festival on April 17, 2015. It has since won many awards, including Best Feature at the ALBA Human Rights Documentary Film Festival, Best of Fest at Chagrin Documentary Film Festival (2017), Best Documentary at Hollywood Film Festival (2015), Best International Documentary at Oaxaca FilmFest (2015), and more.

In April 2016, the Central Board of Film Censors banned Among the Believers from being screened in Pakistan, giving the reason that it “projects the negative image of Pakistan in the context of ongoing fight against extremism terrorism.” Both Naqvi and co-director Hemal Trivedi received death threats after the release of the film, forcing them to go into hiding for a period of time.

In 2017, Naqvi directed, wrote, and produced Insha’Allah Democracy with producer Jared Ian Goldman. The documentary follows the controversial former military dictator of Pakistan, General Pervez Musharraf, as he returns to Pakistan to contest in the 2013 Pakistani general election. Naqvi himself features prominently in the film, as a citizen voting in the country’s general elections for the first time. As a member of the Shia minority, Naqvi is attracted to Musharraf’s secular stance and past crackdowns on sectarian violence. The film examines the contradictions and complexities of a nascent democratic process in a country recovering from a long history of military rule.

The film had its world premiere at Sheffield Doc/Fest (2017), where it was nominated for the Tim Hetherington Award. It has also screened at Films from the South (2017), DOC NYC (2017), IDFA (2017), FIPA (2018), Human Rights Watch Film Festival (2018), and the UK Asian Film Festival (2018).

Pakistani activists in the UK called for the film to be banned from its London premiere at the Human Rights Watch Film Festival (2018), claiming that the film "legitimises and glorifies military dictatorial rules and undermines civilian/parliament supremacy.” In response the Human Rights Watch released a statement saying that the film was chosen because of its criticism of military rule.

Naqvi’s next film, The Accused: Damned or Devoted?, which he directed and produced, was released in 2020. The film follows the rise of the cleric Khadim Hussain Rizvi as he pushes to preserve Pakistan’s blasphemy laws by rallying millions of supporters, running for elections, and silencing those attempting to change the law by condemning them to death. It also follows Asia Bibi, a Christian woman falsely accused of blasphemy, as well as activist Gulalai Ismail as she is falsely accused of blasphemy.

When he was initially approached to make a film about the blasphemy laws in Pakistan, Naqvi refused because of the potential security risk. Naqvi did eventually make the film, and has said that it is “the most dangerous film” he has worked on.

The film won Best Investigation at the Asian Media Awards (2020). It was a runner-up in the Feature Documentary category at the South Asian Film Festival of Montréal (2020). It was also nominated for the CPH: DOX F:ACT Award (2020), and in the International Affairs Documentary category for the AIB Media Excellence awards (2020).

Filmography

Awards and nominations

External links
 Mohammed Naqvi at IMDb
 Mohammed Naqvi at Rotten Tomatoes

References

Pakistani filmmakers
University of Pennsylvania alumni
Living people
1979 births